Zamoyska is a surname. Notable people with the surname include:

Gryzelda Konstancja Zamoyska (1623–1672), Polish szlachcianka and mother of King Michał Korybut Wiśniowiecki
Helena Zamoyska (died 1761), Polish noblewoman
Marianna Zamoyska (1631–1668), Polish noble lady